Pasquale Ottino or Ottini (1578 in Verona – 1630 in Verona), was an Italian painter.

Biography
Ottino was a pupil, alongside Alessandro Turchi, in the studio of Felice Brusasorci. After the master's death in 1605, he completed alongside Turchi the large canvas depicting Fall of Manna in the church of San Giorgio in Braida in Verona, left unfinished on the master's death in 1605. His early works attest to the decidedly Mannerist character of the initial phase of his career. The sources indicate fairly constant activity in his hometown, even though there are still some doubts as to the reconstruction of his artistic career, especially incongruities regarding a trip to Rome that may have taken place with his companions Turchi and Marcantonio Bassetti around 1615. He died of plague in Verona in 1630.

Paintings
 Massacre of the Innocents, painted for San Stefano in Verona.
 He painted San Niccolo for the church of San Giorgio
 Completed Deposition for the church of San Francesco di Paola.
 Assumption of the Virgin

References

 Domenico Sedini, Pasquale Ottino, online catalogue Artgate by Fondazione Cariplo, 2010, CC BY-SA (source for the first revision of this article).

Other projects

1578 births
1630 deaths
16th-century Italian painters
Italian male painters
Italian Baroque painters
17th-century Italian painters
Painters from Verona
17th-century deaths from plague (disease)